Haplogroup N may refer to:

 Haplogroup N-M231, a human Y-chromosome (Y-DNA) haplogroup
 Haplogroup N (mtDNA), a human mitochondrial DNA (mtDNA) haplogroup